Ireland's Cross is a small hamlet in the civil parish of Woore in Shropshire, England.

References

Hamlets in Shropshire